This is a list of notable current automobile manufacturers including buses & trucks manufacturers but excluding agricultural, construction, military & motorcycle vehicles with articles on Wikipedia by region.

A

Algeria

 SNVI

Argentina

 Zanella
 Koller

Australia

 ACE EV Group
 Borland Racing
 Bolwell
 Brabham Automotive
 Elfin Sports Cars
 Ford Australia
 GMSV

Austria

 Magna Steyr
 Puch
 Tushek & Spigel

Azerbaijan

 AzSamand
 Ganja Auto Plant
 Nakhchivan Automobile Plant

B

Bangladesh

Aftab Automobiles
PHP Automobiles

Belarus

 BelAZ
 BelGee
 MAZ
 MoAZ
 MZKT
 Neman

Belgium

 Gillet
 Van Hool

Brazil

 Agrale
 Comil
 Marcopolo
 Mascarello
 Neobus
 TAC

Bulgaria

Litex
SIN

C

Canada

Bombardier
Campagna
Felino Corporation
Intermeccanica
INKAS
New Flyer
Nova Bus
Prevost
Terradyne

China

Arcfox
Aion
Apex Motors
BAIC
Baojun
BAW
Bestune
Brilliance
BYD
Changan
Changhe
Chery
Dongfeng
Englon
EuAuto
Everus
FAW
Hongqi
Foton
GAC
Geely
Great Wall
Hafei
Haima
Hanteng
Hawtai
Haval
Heibao
Higer
Jiangling
Jinbei
Jonway
Karry
Landwind
Leahead
Li Auto
Nio
Qoros
Roewe
SAIC
Sehol
Soueast
Trumpchi
Wuling
Voyah
Xpeng
Yudo Auto
Yutong
Zinoro
Zotye
ZX Auto

Croatia

DOK-ING
Rimac

Czech Republic

 Škoda
 Tatra
 Avia
 Kaipan
 MTX
 Praga

D

Denmark
Zenvo

E

Ethiopia

 Marathon Motors Engineering

F

Finland

 Valmet Automotive
 Electric Raceabout
 Toroidion
 Sisu Auto

France

 Aixam
 Alpine
 Auverland
 Bolloré
 Bugatti
 Citroën
 Exagon
 Hommell
 Ligier
 Microcar
 Méga
 Peugeot
 PGO
 Renault
 Venturi

G

Germany

German Big Three 

 BMW
 Alpina
 BMW
 Mercedes-Benz
 Daimler Truck
 Mercedes-Benz
 Setra
 Smart
 Volkswagen
 Audi
 MAN
 Porsche
 Volkswagen

Others 

 Apollo
 Artega
 Bitter
 Isdera
 Lotec
 Multicar
 Neoplan
 Opel
 Ruf
 Sono
 Wiesmann

Ghana

 Kantanka

Greece

 ELVO
 Keraboss
 Korres
 Namco
 Replicar Hellas

I

India

 Ajanta Group
 Ashok Leyland
 Asia MotorWorks
 Atul Auto
 Bajaj
 Eicher
 Force
 Hindustan
 Hradyesh
 ICML
 KAL
 Mahindra
 Omega Seiki Mobility
 Tara International
 Tata
 TVS

Indonesia

Astra International
Esemka
Indomobil Group
Pindad

Iran

 Bahman
 Iran Khodro
 Kish Khodro
 MVM
 Pars Khodro
 SAIPA

Israel

 Ha'argaz
 Merkavim
 Tomcar
 Zibar

Italy

 Abarth
 Alfa Romeo
 Bremach
 Casalini
 Covini
 CTS
 DR Motor
 Ferrari
 Fiat
 Iso
 Italdesign
 Iveco
 Lancia
 Lamborghini
 Maserati
 Mazzanti
 Minardi
 Pagani
 Piaggio
 Pininfarina
 Vespa
 Zagato

J

Japan

 Acura
 Aspark
 Daihatsu
 Dome
 GLM
 Hino
 Honda
 Infiniti
 Isuzu
Kawasaki
 Lexus
 Mazda
 Mitsubishi Motors
 Mitsubishi Fuso
 Mitsuoka
 Nissan
 Subaru
 Suzuki
 Tommykaira
 Toyota
 UD Trucks
 Yamaha

K

Kenya
Mobius Motors

L

Latvia

 Dartz

Lebanon
 W Motors

Luxembourg
 MDI

M

Malaysia

 Bufori
 DefTech
 Inokom
 Naza
 Perodua
 Proton

Mexico

 DINA
 Mastretta
 VUHL

Monaco
 Venturi

Morocco

 Laraki
 Somaca

Myanmar
Shan Star

N

Netherlands

 Burton
 Carver
 DAF
 Dakar
 Donkervoort
 Spijkstaal
 Spyker
 Stellantis (Multi-National)
 Vandenbrink
 VDL Bus & Coach
 Vencer

New Zealand

 Anziel
 Saker Cars
 Trekka

Nigeria
 Innoson Motors
 DFM

North Korea

 Pyeonghwa Motors
 Sungri Motors
 Samhung Motors

P

Pakistan

 Sazgar
 United Auto Industries

Philippines

Almazora Motors
Del Monte Motors
Sarao Motors

Poland

 AMZ
 Arrinera
 Autosan 
 Jelcz
 Solaris
 Ursus

Portugal

 Vinci

R

Romania

 Dacia
 ROMAN

Russia

 Avtotor
 AvtoVAZ
 IZh
 Lada
 GAZ
 Kamaz
 LiAZ
 Marussia
 PAZ
 Sollers
 UAZ

S

Serbia

 FAP
 FAS
 Ikarbus
 IMT

Slovenia

Adria Mobil
Tushek & Spigel

South Africa

Advanced Automotive Design
Perana Performance Group

South Korea

 CT&T United
 Daewoo Bus
 Genesis
 Hyundai
 Kia
 Renault Samsung
 SsangYong
 Tata Daewoo

Spain

 Abadal
 Aspid
 Cupra
 GTA
 Hispano-Suiza
 Irizar
 SEAT
 Spania
 Tauro
 Tramontana
 Uro

Sri Lanka
 Micro
 Vega EVX

Sweden

 Koenigsegg
 NEVS
 Polestar
 Scania
 Uniti
 Volvo Buses
 Volvo Cars
 Volvo Trucks

Switzerland

Leblanc
Rinspeed
 Sbarro

T

Taiwan

 CMC
 Luxgen
 Yulon

Thailand

 Thai Rung

Tunisia
 Wallyscar

Turkey

 BMC
 Diardi
 Erkunt
 Etox
 Fiat-Tofaş
 Guleryuz
 Karsan
 Otokar
 Özaltin
 Temsa
 Togg

U

Ukraine

Bogdan
Etalon
KrAZ
LAZ
ZAZ
LuAZ (now part of Bogdan)

United Arab Emirates

 STREIT Group
 W Motors

United Kingdom

 AC
 Alexander Dennis
 Apex
 Ariel
 Aston Martin
 Atalanta
 BAC
 Bentley
 Bowler
 Caterham
 David Brown
 Ginetta
 GKD Sports
 Grinnall
 Jaguar
 Lagonda
 Land Rover
 Lister
 Lotus
 McLaren
 MG
 Mini
 Morgan
 Noble
 Radical Sportscars
 Rolls-Royce
 Ronart
 TVR
 Ultima Sports
 Vauxhall

United States

Big Three 

 General Motors
 Buick
 Cadillac
 Chevrolet
 GMC
 Stellantis
 Chrysler
 Dodge
 Jeep
 Ram
 Ford Motor
 Ford
 Lincoln

Others 

 All American Racers
 AM General
 Anteros Coachworks
 Aptera
 Arcimoto
 Autocar
 Bremach
 Callaway
 Canoo
 DeLorean
 Detroit Electric
 E-Z-GO
 Falcon Motorsports
 Faraday
 Fisker
 Freightliner
 Gillig
 Google
 GEM
 Hennessey
 International Harvester
 Karma
 Kenworth
 Lordstown
 Lucid
 Mack
 MCI
 Navistar
 Nikola
 Oshkosh
 Panoz
 Peterbilt
 Pierce
 Polaris
 Proterra
 RAESR
 Rezvani
 Rivian
 Rossion
 Saleen
 SCG
 Shelby 
 SRT
 SSC
 Tesla
 Thomas Built Buses
 Trion Supercars
 VLF
 Western Star
 Workhorse

Uruguay
Effa

Uzbekistan

 SAZ

V

Venezuela

Current

Venirauto

Vietnam

VinFast

See also

List of motorcycle manufacturers
List of car brands
List of Asian automobile manufacturers
List of European automobiles
List of manufacturers by motor vehicle production
Timeline of motor vehicle brands

References

See also
List of automobile manufacturers
List of automobile marques
List of current automobile manufacturers (alphabetical)
Timeline of motor vehicle brands

 Current
Manufacturers, current
 Current
 Current
 Current by country
Automobile manufacturers